Il disertore (also known as The Deserter) is a 1983 Italian war drama film written and directed by Giuliana Berlinguer. It is based on the novel with the same name by Giuseppe Dessì. It was entered into the competition at the 40th edition of the Venice Film Festival.

Plot

Cast 
Irene Papas as Mariangela
 Cristina Maccioni as  Pietrina
Omero Antonutti as Don Coi
 Enrico Pau as  Monsignor Pau
 Antonio Cipriato as  Roberto Manca 
 Salvatore Mossa as Francesco Isalle
Mattia Sbragia as  Saverio
 Isella Orchis as  Lica
 Adolfo Lastetti as  Urbano Costai
 Franco Noè as  Dante Taverna
 Piero Nuti as  Alessandro Comina

See also    
 List of Italian films of 1983

References

External links

1983 films
Italian war drama films
1980s war drama films
1983 drama films
1980s Italian-language films
1980s Italian films